Bohumil Veselý (born 18 June 1945) is a retired Czech footballer.

During his career he played for AC Sparta Prague. He earned 26 caps for the Czechoslovakia national football team, and participated in the 1970 FIFA World Cup.

External links

1945 births
Living people
Footballers from Prague
Czech footballers
Czechoslovak footballers
Czechoslovakia international footballers
1970 FIFA World Cup players
AC Sparta Prague players
Association football midfielders